The Zatch Bell! manga was written and illustrated by Makoto Raiku. Formally titled , the story focuses on the title character Zatch Bell, who is one of a hundred Mamodo participating in an elimination tournament on Earth for the crown of the Mamodo world. The series chronicles Zatch’s strengthening bond with his human partner, Kiyo Takamine, and his struggles through the tournament, culminating with his eventual win and subsequent departure from Earth. The series ran for 323 chapters in Shogakukan's shōnen manga magazine Weekly Shōnen Sunday from January 10, 2001, to December 26, 2007. The chapters were collected in thirty-three tankōbon volumes released from May 8, 2001, to June 18, 2008.

In North America, the manga was published in English language by Viz Media; twenty-five volumes were released from August 2, 2005, to June 9, 2009. The manga was also published in English by Chuang Yi in Singapore.

For the series' tenth anniversary, Raiku launched a one-shot chapter titled , which depicts Zatch in the events after the tournament and preceding his coronation as king, and was published in Kodansha's shōnen manga magazine Bessatsu Shōnen Magazine on March 9, 2011; the chapter was included as an extra chapter in the sixth volume of Raiku's Animal Land series. Kodansha also reprinted the series in a sixteen-volume bunkoban edition between March 8, 2011, and June 7, 2012. Raiku self-published a sixteen-volume kanzenban edition, released digitally starting in July 2018, and physically in April 2019, in response to popular demand. A sequel series titled  was released online starting March 14, 2022.



Volume list

References

External links
Official Zatch Bell website

Zatch Bell!